Rathealy Ringfort is a ringfort (rath) and National Monument located in County Kilkenny, Ireland.

Location

History

Rathealy is believed to derive its name from Élothach mac Fáelchon, king of the Uí Cheinnselaig of South Leinster. It also known as the Stuaic of Rathealy, the Irish word meaning "peak" or "spike". A standing stone nearby may be pre-Christian.

Description
Rathealy Ringfort is a trivallate rath with a rectangular house, circular house and souterrain entrance clearly visible.

References

External links

Archaeological sites in County Kilkenny
National Monuments in County Kilkenny